Ricordi  may refer to:

People
Giovanni Ricordi (1785–1853), Italian violinist and publishing company founder
Giulio Ricordi (1840–1912), Italian publisher and musician

Music
Casa Ricordi, an Italian music publishing company established in 1808
Dischi Ricordi, a subsidiary established in 1958
Ricordi, a 1985 album by Carla Boni
"Ricordi" (song), a 2008 song by Finlay

Other uses
Cyclura ricordi, a species of rock iguana
Ricordi, plural of ricordo, modello-like copy of a work of art

See also
 House of Ricordi, a 1954 French-Italian film based on the history of Casa Ricordi